In psycholinguistics, semantic processing is the stage of language processing that occurs after one hears a word and encodes its meaning: the mind relates the word to other words with similar meanings.  Once a word is perceived, it is placed in a context mentally that allows for a deeper processing.  Therefore, semantic processing produces memory traces that last longer than those produced by shallow processing, since shallow processing produces fragile memory traces that decay rapidly.

Semantic processing is the deepest level of processing and it requires the listener to think about the meaning of the cue.  Studies on brain imaging have shown that, when semantic processing occurs, there is increased brain activity in the left prefrontal regions of the brain that does not occur during different kinds of processing.  One study used MRI to measure the brain activity of subjects while they made semantic decisions.  The participants then took a memory test after a short period of time.  When the subjects showed high confidence and correctly retained the information, the fMRI measured increased activity in the left prefrontal regions.

Convergent semantic processing
Convergent semantic processing occurs during tasks that elicit a limited number of responses.  During these tasks, subjects must suppress alternate options in order to select a single best option from a multitude of choices.  It is believed that the left hemisphere of the brain dominates convergent semantic processing due to the fine grained, small window of temporal integration.  Spatially, neurons in the left hemispheres occupy mutually exclusive regions, allowing for the more fine-tuned response seen in convergent semantic processing.

Neurons in the left hemisphere

The left hemisphere quickly selects the most familiar meaning or response, while suppressing other closely related meanings.  In addition, when presented with an ambiguous word with no context, the left hemisphere will prime the most frequent meaning of the word.  Studies of patients with left hemisphere damage have demonstrated a disruption of convergent semantic processing, causing subjects to associate words with abstract, non-literal meanings produced by the right hemisphere.  For example, a subject with left hemisphere damage may affiliate the word “deep” with “wise” rather than its literal antonym “shallow.”

Examples of convergent processing
Experimenter instructs the subject to select an infinite verb that most accurately describes the function of each stimuli.

Stimulus/Verb
Hammer/To Pound, Needle/To Sew, Bat/To Swing, Sponge/To Scrub, Basketball/To Shoot, Pencil/To Write

Divergent semantic processing
Divergent semantic processing occurs during linguistic tasks that can elicit a large variety of responses.  During these tasks, listeners produce different possible meanings and list all the other words that come to their minds.  It is believed that the right hemisphere of the brain commands divergent semantic processing through its coarse grained, large windows of temporal integration.  Neurons in the right hemisphere occupy overlapping regions of space, allowing for the network activation of concepts necessary for divergent processing.

Neurons in the right hemisphere

The right hemisphere activates concepts that are more loosely associated with a stimulus, allowing for production of non-literal and less frequent meanings of words.  For example, when presented with an ambiguous word without context, the right hemisphere primes less frequent meaning of the word.  Studies of patient with right hemisphere damage have demonstrated a disruption of divergent semantic processing, causing subjects to affiliate words with concrete, literal meanings produced by the left hemisphere.  For example, a subject with right hemisphere damage will group the word “deep” with its antonym “shallow,” and have trouble producing the non-literal association of “deep” with “wise.”

Examples of divergent processing
Experimenter instructs the subject to produce as many verbs as possible for each stimuli.
Stimulus
Basketball

Verbs
To shoot, to pass, to throw, to dribble, to steal, to block, to tip, to spin, etc.

References

Semantics